The Leinster Junior Hurling Championship is a junior "knockout" competition in the game of Hurling played in the province of Leinster in Ireland. The series of games are organised by the Leinster Council.

The winners of the Leinster Junior Hurling Championship each year progress to play the other provincial champions for a chance to win the All-Ireland Junior Hurling Championship.

Generally, the strong hurling counties have fielded their second team in this competition. In recent years though, they have participated in the Leinster Intermediate Hurling Championship instead.
Since 2005, the competition has been suspended, with the counties participating in the Christy Ring Cup or Nicky Rackard Cup instead.

Top winners

Roll of honour

 1931 Kilkenny 2–09 Dublin 1–05 After objection and counter objection, declared null and void
 1908 Unfinished. Dublin awarded the title.

See also
 Munster Junior Hurling Championship
 Connacht Junior Hurling Championship
 Ulster Junior Hurling Championship

References

External sources
 Leinster Junior Hurling Roll of Honour
 Leinster List of final results 1905–1999

 3